Paul Westermeier (9 July 1892 – 17 October 1972) was a German film actor.

Selected filmography

 Wedding in the Eccentric Club (1917)
 Agnes Arnau and Her Three Suitors (1918)
 About the Son (1921)
 Memoirs of a Film Actress (1921)
 Children of Darkness (1921)
 The Big Shot (1922)
 The Enchantress (1924)
 Annemarie and Her Cavalryman (1926)
 The Pride of the Company (1926)
 Circus Romanelli (1926)
 We'll Meet Again in the Heimat (1926)
 A Crazy Night (1927)
 The Long Intermission (1927)
 Always Be True and Faithful (1927)
 Lemke's Widow (1928)
 Dyckerpotts' Heirs (1928)
 Dear Homeland (1929)
 Retreat on the Rhine (1930)
 Josef the Chaste (1930)
 Alraune (1930)
 The Little Escapade (1931)
Errant Husbands (1931)
 A Crafty Youth (1931)
 Everyone Asks for Erika (1931)
 The Beggar Student (1931)
 Weekend in Paradise (1931)
 The Soaring Maiden (1931)
 Berlin-Alexanderplatz (1931)
 The Spanish Fly (1931)
 Louise, Queen of Prussia (1931)
 Quick (1932)
 At Your Orders, Sergeant (1932)
 Things Are Getting Better Already (1932)
 How Shall I Tell My Husband? (1932)
 Inge and the Millions (1933)
 The Castle in the South (1933)
 The Star of Valencia (1933)
 Morgenrot (1933)
 If I Were King (1934)
 What Am I Without You (1934)
 Miss Liselott (1934)
 The Two Seals (1934)
 Love and the First Railway (1934)
 The Sporck Battalion (1934)
 Decoy (1934)
 The Four Musketeers (1934)
 Mother and Child (1934)
 The Valiant Navigator (1935)
 Paul and Pauline (1936)
 The Abduction of the Sabine Women (1936)
 Uncle Bräsig (1936)
 Savoy Hotel 217 (1936)
 The Violet of Potsdamer Platz (1936)
 Fridericus (1937)
 Autobus S (1937)
 The Irresistible Man (1937)
 The Divine Jetta (1937)
 His Best Friend (1937)
 Alarm in Peking (1937)
 Togger (1937)
 The Roundabouts of Handsome Karl (1938)
 Red Orchids (1938)
 Nanon (1938)
 The Girl of Last Night (1938)
 The Woman at the Crossroads (1938)
 The Green Emperor (1939)
 Who's Kissing Madeleine? (1939)
 Uproar in Damascus (1939)
 The Journey to Tilsit (1939)
 Twilight (1940)
 Andreas Schlüter (1942)
 Diesel (1942)
 The Buchholz Family (1944)
 Marriage of Affection (1944)
 Young Hearts (1944)
 Somewhere in Berlin (1946)
 The Court Concert (1948)
 Torreani (1951)
 Professor Nachtfalter (1951)
 Queen of the Night (1951)
 The White Horse Inn (1952)
The Flower of Hawaii (1953)
 The Emperor Waltz (1953)
 Money from the Air (1953)
 Hooray, It's a Boy! (1953)
 The Cousin from Nowhere (1953)
 Sauerbruch – Das war mein Leben (1954)
 Columbus Discovers Kraehwinkel (1954)
 Money from the Air (1954)
 The Missing Miniature (1954)
 The Beautiful Miller (1954)
 The Happy Village (1955)
 Father's Day (1955)
 The Congress Dances (1955)
 The Stolen Trousers (1956)
  (1957)
 Little Man on Top (1957)
 Lemke's Widow (1957)
 Almenrausch and Edelweiss (1957)
 Mikosch, the Pride of the Company (1958)
Triplets on Board (1959)

References

External links
 

1892 births
1972 deaths
German male film actors
German male silent film actors
Male actors from Berlin
20th-century German male actors